Lupus vasculitis is a complication of systemic lupus erythematosus in which the autoimmune response causes the deposition of immune complexes, such as rheumatoid factor, within the blood vessels. It may manifest in as high as 56% of lupus patients throughout their life, in contrast to antiphospholipid syndrome which has a prevalence of 15%. Vasculitis more often affects younger men.

References

Vascular diseases